Isophrictis tophella is a moth of the family Gelechiidae. It was described by Walsingham in 1888. It is found in North America, where it has been recorded from California, Arizona and New Mexico.

The wingspan is about 23 mm. The forewings are dull ashy brown, with a considerable sprinkling of brighter (more reddish brown) scales. The tips of the scales about the apical margin and cilia are paler and give a speckled appearance to the end of the wing. The hindwings are brownish cinereous.

References

Moths described in 1888
Isophrictis